Lac Dodon is an iron meteorite discovered by Roland Octerneau of Montreal on rural private property near Lac Dodon, Saint-Calixte, Quebec.

The recovered fragment measures approximately  x  x . The meteorite was oxidized on its exterior and lying at the surface of the ground.

Composition and classification
The meteorite is a coarse octahedrite (mean bandwidth 1.34mm) with narrow cloudy taenite bands separating the kamacite lamellae. Occasional areas of coarse to fine acicular plessite and net plessite are Neumann lines and rhabdites. Sparsely developed Brezina lamellae and fine-grained globular schreibersite are present. At one exterior surface, a heat-affected zone 0.1mm thick containing unequilibrated alpha(sub)2-kamacite is preserved. Cloudy taenite extending into this zone has developed bainitic texture. The presence of the zone suggests a relatively recent fall.

References

See also
 Glossary of meteoritics
Meteorite

Meteorites found in Canada